Mickey Lee Soule (June 6, 1946 in Cortland, New York) is an American musician. He was the keyboard player for New York hard rock band Elf and a founding member of Rainbow.

Soule had a band in the mid-1960s until he was drafted into the army. After his honorable discharge he joined The Elves after the band's original keyboardist, Doug Thaler, was severely injured in a car accident that killed guitarist Nick Pantas. In the first years of the 1970s, The Elves (after 1972 known simply as Elf) enjoyed minor success as a consistent opening act for Deep Purple.  That connection to Deep Purple opened up the opportunity for Soule (and vocalist Ronnie James Dio) to participate in Roger Glover's 1974 concept album The Butterfly Ball and the Grasshopper's Feast.  In addition to co-writing credits on two songs, Soule also sang the lead vocals on the song "No Solution".  Soule and Glover would work together sporadically in the years following.

In early 1975, Soule and the rest of Elf (minus guitarist Steve Edwards) transformed into Rainbow, featuring Deep Purple guitarist Ritchie Blackmore. During this time the third and final Elf album, Trying to Burn the Sun, was recorded when the former Elf were not in the studio recording Rainbow's debut album. Elf had effectively dissolved by the time that album was released as the members hoped to continue with Blackmore.  However, following the recording of the Rainbow album, Blackmore gradually fired the entire line up with the exception of Dio before Rainbow had begun to tour.

In 1976 Soule toured France with the Ian Gillan Band.

Soule continues to play locally in New York. In 1996, Mickey Lee Soule started working as a keyboard tech for Deep Purple's Jon Lord, later he became bass tech for Roger Glover until he retired from touring in 2014. He began working for Roger Glover and Deep Purple again in 2016.

Discography 
With Elf
 1972 - Elf
 1974 - Carolina County Ball
 1975 - Trying to Burn the Sun

With Ritchie Blackmore's Rainbow
 1975 - Ritchie Blackmore's Rainbow

With Ian Gillan Band
 2003 - Rarities 1975-1977

Other

 1974 - Roger Glover - The Butterfly Ball and the Grasshopper's Feast
 1978 - Roger Glover - Elements
 1982 - Eddie Hardin - Circumstantial Evidence
 1990 - A'LA Rock - Indulge
 2000 - Deep Purple - In Concert with The London Symphony Orchestra
 2002 - Roger Glover - Snapshot
 2006 - Ian Gillan - Gillan's Inn
 2011 - Roger Glover - If Life Was Easy

References

Rainbow (rock band) members
American heavy metal keyboardists
American rock keyboardists
Musicians from New York (state)
People from Cortland, New York
1946 births
Living people
Elf (band) members
Ian Gillan Band members
20th-century American keyboardists